Marichbania may refer to:

Marichbania, Barguna, Bangladesh
Marichbania, Pirojpur, Bangladesh